Scarbrough is a surname. Notable people with the surname include:

Bo Scarbrough (born 1996), American football player
Dan Scarbrough (born 1978), former rugby union player who played on the wing or full back for Leeds Tykes, Saracens, Racing Métro and England
John Scarbrough (1885–1960), college football player
Lucy Scarbrough (1927–2020), American musician
T. G. Scarbrough, American football coach

See also
Earl of Scarbrough, a title in the Peerage of England
William Scarbrough House, historic house in Savannah, Georgia
Scarbrough Stakes, listed flat horse race in Great Britain
Scarborough (disambiguation), many place names